Christoph Chorherr (born 9 December 1960, Vienna) is an Austrian politician. From 1996 until December 1997 he was federal spokesperson of the Austrian Green Party.

From 1979-86 he studied economics at the Vienna University of Economics and Business Administration, specialising in environmental economics. In 1991 he became a member of the federal state council of Vienna for the Austrian Greens. He was federal spokesperson of the party from 1996 until December 1997, after which he retreated from federal politics and went back to lead Vienna's federal state party politics.
He teaches at the Vienna University of Economics and Business Administration.

Chorherr is founder and head of two NGOs:
 "S²arch - Social Sustainable Architecture" which operates aid projects in South Africa 
 "Ithuba Skills College"

References

External links

 Chorherr`s political blog

1960 births
Living people
Vienna University of Economics and Business alumni
The Greens – The Green Alternative politicians